Sagebrush Golf Club is a public golf course located on the southern bank of Nicola Lake in Quilchena,  from the town of Merritt in British Columbia, Canada. The golf course was opened in 2009. 

The course and associated lands cover 400 acres and the course can stretch out to 7399 yards. Currently, the golf course can accommodate up to 60 players per day.

Sagebrush has been designed as a ‘minimalist’ course. It was designed by Rod Whitman, Richard Zokol and Armen Suny. 

After its opening in 2009, Sagebrush received praise but the club soon ran into legal problems. Disagreements and other issues led to Sagebrush being closed in October 2014.

The golf course was bought by the Newmark Group in November 2015. However, it remained closed until 2021 when the property was purchased by a group of investors led by local real estate developer Andrew Knott. Sagebrush was reopened in 2021

See also 

 List of golf courses in British Columbia

References

External links 

 Official website

Golf clubs and courses in British Columbia